Tshwarelo Mattwes Bereng (born 30 October 1990) is a Mosotho footballer who plays as an attacking midfielder for Mbabane Highlanders and the Lesotho national football team.

References

Living people
1990 births
Lesotho footballers
Lesotho international footballers
Association football midfielders

Moroka Swallows F.C. players
Cape Town All Stars players
Chippa United F.C. players
Black Leopards F.C. players
TS Sporting F.C. players
Marumo Gallants F.C. players
South African Premier Division players
National First Division players
Lesotho expatriate footballers
Expatriate soccer players in South Africa
Lesotho expatriate sportspeople in South Africa
Expatriate footballers in Eswatini